Talkington Township is located in Sangamon County, Illinois. As of the 2010 census, its population was 189 and it contained 86 housing units.

Geography

Demographics

References

External links
 US Census
 City-data.com
 Illinois State Archives

Townships in Sangamon County, Illinois
Springfield metropolitan area, Illinois
Townships in Illinois